De Heimerter Mole is a hollow post mill in Burgwerd, Friesland, Netherlands which has been restored to working order. The mill is listed as a Rijksmonument, number 39348.

History
The mill was then owned by the church at Schalsum In 1950, the sails were fitted with streamlined leading edges on the Fok system. In 1957, a diesel engine was installed as auxiliary power and the wooden Archimedes' screw replaced by one of steel. In 1969, the mill ceased work. The diesel engine was removed in the mid-1970s and an automatic pumping station built. In 1973, the mill was bought by De Hollandsche Molen. In 1976, the mill was restored to working order. On 16 May 1988, the mill was sold to Stichting De Fryske Mole (English:Frisian Mills Foundation).

Description

De Heimerter Mole is what the Dutch describe as a "spinnenkopmolen" (English: Spider mill). It is a small hollow post mill winded by a winch. The windshaft also carries the brake wheel which has 29 cogs. This drives the wallower (16 cogs) at the top of the upright shaft, which passed through the main post. At the bottom of the upright shaft, the crown wheel (31 cogs) drives the Archimedes' screw via a gear wheel with 29 pegs. It is inclined at an angle of 28°. Each revolution of the screw lifts  of water.

Public access
De Heimerter Mole is open to the public by appointment.

References

Windmills in Friesland
Windmills completed in 1811
Hollow post mills in the Netherlands
Rijksmonuments in Friesland